The First Years of Piracy is an album by German band Running Wild. It is their last album with both bassist Jens Becker and drummer AC. It contains re-recorded versions of songs from the first three albums.

A promo video was made for this version of "Branded and Exiled".

Track listing

Personnel
 Rolf Kasparek – vocals, guitar, producer
 Axel Morgan – guitars
 Jens Becker – bass guitar
 AC – drums
Jan Nemec - mixing

1991 compilation albums
1991 remix albums
Noise Records albums
Running Wild (band) albums